Hasan Khan (also Romanized as Ḩasan Khān) is a village in Chehel Chay Rural District, in the Central District of Minudasht County, Golestan Province, Iran. At the 2006 census, its population was 991, in 244 families.

References 

Populated places in Minudasht County